Helen Keaney (also sometimes credited as Helen Rosenthal) (b. 1962) is an American actress, comedian, and hostess on HSN (Home Shopping Network). She was a cast member of "3 Blonde Moms" Previously she did national television commercials for various products including Clorox, Tylenol, Gateway, Degree Deodorant, Dr. Scholl's, Starkist, Thermacare and Verizon.

She is notable for her role as Diane in the 1987 cult classic film Plutonium Baby credited under her given name, Helen Rosenthal, and has also voiced Nikki in the video game Pandemonium.

In 2000 and 2001, Keaney hosted Lover's Lounge, a two-hour game show block of dating and relationship game shows on Game Show Network with Teresa Strasser.

See also
List of actors

References

External links
 Official Helen Keaney website
 

Living people
Year of birth missing (living people)
American women comedians
21st-century American women